Koopa is a rock band from Sible Hedingham, near Colchester, Essex, England. The band formed in 2000 by the brothers Stuart Cooper (drums) and Oliver "Ollie" Cooper (vocals and guitar), plus Joe Murphy (vocals, bass, production). The band became the first act to have a Top 40 UK Singles Chart hit based on download sales only, and the first act to have a charting single without being signed to a record label, both facilitated by then-recent changes to rules for eligibility for the singles chart.

Career 
The band began working together whilst Ollie Cooper was a teenager at school. In 2003 they made some recordings with B-Unique Records and EMI.

Between 2004 and 2007, the band toured continuously, both locally and nationally. During this period, they released two singles on Mad Cow Records. "No Trend" made the UK Singles Chart, peaking at No. 71. Their records included "Stand Up 4 England", a World Cup related song supporting the England national team, the lyrics of which were written for the band by Paul Baker. The single featured on the 2006 re-release of England (the album).

At the end of 2006 the band released a non-chart-eligible EP called "Three in a Bed with Bobby George". The cover featured the band in bed with the darts player, Bobby George. The EP also featured "Erin's Main Obsession", "Pop Rock Factory", "How True" and "Unique" as well as "Blag, Steal and Borrow", the song that went on to become the band's download-only history making single.

2007: Breakthrough 
In January 2007, changes to the chart rules in the UK meant that songs which are not released on physical formats (such as CDs or on vinyl) would now be eligible to chart through downloaded copies. Koopa's single "Blag, Steal & Borrow" was released through music distributor Ditto Music and charted at No. 31 on 14 January 2007, making it the first single to chart without ever being 'released' in the traditional sense.

Koopa were reported as being the first 'unsigned' band to reach the charts. Although "self-issued" records are fairly common for unsigned bands, the costs of doing so mean that it is relatively rare for enough copies of such records to be produced in order to gain a chart position. Wealthier artists who are able to fund their own record label have also previously charted without a record deal. KOOPA's achievement is to have entered the Top 40 Chart as an unsigned band through sales of downloads alone, there being no physical copy of the single in existence.

In June 2007 the band were invited to open the Isle of Wight Festival from the main stage.

On 11 June 2007. "One Off Song for the Summer" debuted on the midweek chart at No. 12, later in the week it dropped to No. 17. By the following Sunday, 17 June, the single had fallen to No. 21 in the charts.

October brought further success for the band when they returned from the Glasswerk New Music Awards with, not only the MySpace Award in recognition of their successful use of the site in their self-promotion, but also the final award of the night, The 2007 Achievement Award.

On 29 October 2007 "The Crash" was released which listed in the midweek chart at No. 12, appearing in the Official UK Singles Chart the following Sunday at No. 16 making them a "Top 20" band.

2008: Signed band 
On 15 January 2008, Koopa announced on their MySpace page, that they had signed a deal with record label Pied Piper Records for three albums.

On 13 February 2008, again on MySpace, the band announced that their new record company; Pied Piper, had given them the opportunity to record an album in the US, which was to be produced by Mark Hoppus (Blink 182). The band also announced the album was receiving its final mix and that they would be main support for Bowling for Soup on a UK Tour. The album was mastered by Brian Gardiner and was released at the beginning of 2009. In August 2008 the band announced that the first single from the forthcoming album would be "Gimmie It Back" which was released on 24 November 2008.

2009: Fresh start 
Early 2009 saw changes in the way the band is run. Frustrated with various issues, the band, at least temporarily, walked away from the label. The band are quoted as saying that they felt "The loss of control and direct communication with the fanbase had harmed the project". Unable to agree with the owners of the label All parties agreed that Koopa will once again become an independent act.

In February 2009, the Hoppus produced album Lies Sell Stories was initially released in Japan via Yoshimoto records. The accompanying radio single "Gimmie It Back" received substantial air and video play on various broadcasters including MTV. After this the band were invited to perform a short promotional tour of Japan, accompanying Metro Station.
In April 2009, it was announced on their MySpace page that the Greatest Hits set – "More hits than a porn website" was slated for release on 8 June 2009, via Genepool/Universal distribution.

As of June 2009, the band have licensed all vintage material to Cohort/Brilliant records in the UK, are signed to Yoshimoto R&C In Japan, and other material including the new album Lies Sell Stories is owned by the band.

2010: Koopa return 
After spending time away, the band have announced they will be making a return in late 2010, having had a very deliberate six months or so "out of the loop", and after working and touring solidly for eight years.  Joe Murphy said: "We've been out of the loop by choice. When you gig for so long, it gets a bit samey, so we took a bit of a break after the last few tours."

The band announced that their break was taken to develop a slightly new sound and new songs.

Discography

Albums 
Blag, Steal and Borrow Japan only – Pyropit records (2007)
Lies Sell Stories Japan only – Yoshimoto R and C (2009)
Greatest Hits (Part One) – UK initially – Brilliant/Universal (June 2009)

Singles

References

External links 
 
 Pied Piper Records
 

English punk rock groups
English pop punk groups
Musical groups from Essex
British musical trios
People from Sible Hedingham